Honey cake may refer to:
 Lekach, Jewish honey cake
 Medivnyk, Ukrainian honey cake
 Medovik, Russian and Soviet honey cake
 Miodownik, Polish honey cake